Sumner is the name of some places in the U.S. state of Wisconsin:
Sumner, Barron County, Wisconsin, a town
Sumner (community), Barron County, Wisconsin, an unincorporated community
Sumner, Jefferson County, Wisconsin, a town
Sumner, Trempealeau County, Wisconsin, a town